is a Spanish-language term derived from a noble surname of northern Spain, the Cachopín of Laredo (present-day Cantabria). It was popularized during the Spanish Golden Age as a stereotype and literary stock character representing the Hidalgo (petty nobility) class which was characterized as arrogant and overbearing. The term remained popular in Mexico, where it would come to be used in the Cry of Dolores.

Definitions, origin and use 
The  (1729) defines  as "The Spaniard that goes and lives in the West Indies, called  in Peru. The phrase was brought from those countries, and is frequently used in Andalucia, and between merchants en route to the West Indies." Since the 1780 edition, the academic dictionary, recognizes the variant beginning with the letter "g" understood to have arisen in the New World: "In The Indies, where they say "  or "". The 1925 edition signals that the etymology is from the Portuguese , or child, and restricts the geographic extent of its use to North America. The current Dictionary of the Royal Spanish Academy derives it from the term .

In 1992, Antonio Alatorre explained how the term was coined by Jorge de Montemayor in 1557 in his pastoral work , because he was amused by the interaction of forms and meanings between this elitist Spanish surname and the word he knew from his native Portuguese , meaning "touchy", "crag", or "boy". In Don Quixote, Cervantes uses the word similarly.

In the Iberian Peninsula, the word would lose this unique meaning, though it would survive in La Mancha into the late twentieth century.

This method of determining etymology, in use in de Mier's time and earlier, became considered antiquated by the later philology of the 19th-Century German Neogrammarians. This school would argue against determining etymology primarily through lexical similarity, and not considering Sound change, which they thought to be the driver of lexical evolution.

The word took root especially in Mexico and Central America, referring to the idea of the upstart Spaniard. Ramón María del Valle-Inclán would bring the word back into the continental vocabulary in his 1926 novel .

The word may be used colloquially either ironically or to indicate disrespect, depending on the context.

Examples 
, 1559, Jorge de Montemayor, 

, 1605 Cervantes, Don Quixote

 Cry of Dolores

See Also 
Peninsular 
Casta

References 

Anti-Spanish sentiment
Spanish words and phrases